Tax brackets are the divisions at which tax rates change in a progressive tax system (or an explicitly regressive tax system, though that is rarer).  Essentially, tax brackets are the cutoff values for taxable income—income past a certain point is taxed at a higher rate.

Example
Imagine that there are three tax brackets: 10%, 20%, and 30%. The 10% rate applies to income from $1 to $10,000; the 20% rate applies to income from $10,001 to $20,000; and the 30% rate applies to all income above $20,000.

Under this system, someone earning $10,000 is taxed at 10%, paying a total of $1,000.  Someone earning $5,000 pays $500, and so on.

Meanwhile, someone who earns $25,000 faces a more complicated calculation. The rate on the first $10,000 is 10%, from $10,001 to $20,000 is 20%, and above that is 30%. Thus, they pay $1,000 for the first $10,000 of income (10%), $2,000 for the second $10,000 of income (20%), and $1,500 for the last $5,000 of income (30%), In total, they pay $4,500, or an 18% average tax rate.

In practice the computation is simplified by using point–slope form or slope–intercept form of the linear equation for the tax on a specific bracket, either as tax on the bottom amount of the bracket plus the tax on the marginal amount within the bracket:

or the tax on the entire amount (at the marginal rate), minus the amount that this overstates tax on the bottom end of the bracket.

See Progressive tax#Computation for details.

Tax brackets in Australia

Individual income tax rates (residents) 
Financial years 2018–19, 2019–20

The above rates do not include the Medicare levy of 2.0%.

Tax brackets in Canada

Canada's federal government has the following tax brackets for the 2012 tax year (all in Canadian dollars). Note that the "basic personal amount" of $15,527 effectively means that income up to this amount is not subject to tax, although it is included in the calculation of taxable income.

Each province except Québec adds their own tax on top of the federal tax. Québec has a completely separate income tax.

Provincial / Territorial Tax Rates for 2012:

Tax brackets in India

Income tax slabs applicable for financial year 2015–16 (Assessment Year- 2016–17)is summarized below:

Tax brackets in Malaysia
Malaysia has the following income tax brackets based on assessment year.

Assessment Year 2020

Tax brackets in Malta
Malta has the following tax brackets for income received during 2012

Single Rates:

Married Rates:

Tax brackets in the Netherlands

Tax brackets in New Zealand

New Zealand has the following income tax brackets (as of 1 October 2010). All values in New Zealand dollars, with the ACC Earners' levy not included.

45% when the employee does not complete a declaration form (IR330).

ACC Earners' Levy for the 2010 tax year is 2.0%, an increase from 1.7% in the 2008 tax year.

Tax brackets in Singapore

2007 & 2008

A personal tax rebate of 20% was granted for 2008, up to a maximum of $2,000.

2013 

All figures are in Singapore dollars.

Tax brackets in South Africa
The Minister of Finance announced new tax rates for the 2012–2013 tax year. They are as follows :

Tax brackets for the 2012 year of assessment

Tax brackets for the 2013 year of assessment

Tax brackets in Switzerland

Personal income tax is progressive in nature. The total rate does not usually exceed 40%.

The Swiss Federal Tax Administration website  provides a broad outline of the Swiss tax system, and full details and tax tables are available in PDF documents.

The complexity of the system is partly because the Confederation, the 26 Cantons that make up the federation,
and about 2 900 communes [municipalities] levy their own taxes based on the Federal Constitution and 
26 Cantonal Constitutions.

Tax brackets in Taiwan

Income tax rates (Individual) 
Financial year 2013

Tax brackets in the United Kingdom

Tax brackets in the United States

2018 tax brackets
As of 1 January 2018, the tax brackets have been updated due to the passage of the Tax Cuts and Jobs Act:

In the United States, the dollar amounts of the federal income tax standard deduction and personal exemptions for the taxpayer and dependents are adjusted annually to account for inflation. This results in yearly changes to the personal income tax brackets even when the federal income tax rates remain unchanged.

2011 tax brackets

Two higher tax brackets (36% and 39.6%) were added in 1993, and then taxes in all brackets were lowered in 2001 through 2003 as follows:

Internal Revenue Code terminology

Gross salary is the amount your employer pays you, plus your income tax liability. Although the tax itself is included in this figure, it is typically the one used when discussing one's pay. For example, John gets paid $50/hour as an administrative director. His annual gross salary is $50/hour x 2,000 hours/year = $100,000/year. Of this, some is paid to John, and the rest to taxes.

W-2 wages are the wages that appear on the employee's W-2 issued by his employer each year in January. A copy of the W-2 is sent to the Internal Revenue Service (IRS). It is the gross salary less any contributions to pre-tax plans. The W-2 form also shows the amount withheld by the employer for federal income tax.

W-2 wages = gross salary less (contributions to employer retirement plan)
less (contributions to employer health plan)
less (contributions to some other employer plans)

Total income is the sum of all taxable income, including the W-2 wages. Almost all income is taxable. There are a few exemptions for individuals such as non-taxable interest on government bonds, a portion of the Social Security (SS) income (not the payments to SS, but the payments from SS to the individual), etc.

Adjusted gross income (AGI) is Total Income less some specific allowed deductions. Such as; alimony paid (income to the recipient), permitted moving expenses, self-employed retirement program, student loan interest, etc.

Itemized deductions are other specific deductions such as; mortgage interest on a home, state income taxes or sales taxes, local property taxes, charitable contributions, state income tax withheld, etc.

Standard deduction is a sort of minimum itemized deduction. If you add up all your itemized deductions and it is less than the standard deduction you take the standard deduction. In 2007 this was $5,350 for those filing individually and $10,700 for married filing jointly.

Personal exemption is a tax exemption in which the taxpayer may deduct an amount from their gross income for each dependent they claim. It was $3,400 in 2007.

Sample tax calculation
Given the complexity of the United States' income tax code, individuals often find it necessary to consult a tax accountant or professional tax preparer. For example, John, a married 44-year-old who has two children, earned a gross salary of $100,000 in 2007. He contributes the maximum $15,500 per year to his employer's 401(k) retirement plan, pays $1,800 per year for his employer's family health plan, and $500 per year to his employer's Flexfund medical expense plan. All of the plans are allowed pre-tax contributions.

Gross pay = $100,000

W-2 wages = $100,000 – $15,500 – $1,800 – $500 = $82,200

John's and his wife's other income is $12,000 from John's wife's wages (she also got a W-2 but had no pre-tax contributions), $200 interest from a bank account, and a $150 state tax refund.

Total Income = $82,200 + $12,000 + $200 + $150 = $94,550.

John's employer reassigned John to a new office and his moving expenses were $8,000, of which $2,000 was not reimbursed by his employer.

Adjusted gross income = $94,550 – $2,000 = $92,550.

John's itemized deductions were $22,300 (mortgage interest, property taxes, and state income tax withheld).

John had four personal exemptions—himself, his wife and two children. His total personal exemptions were 4 x $3,400 = $13,600.

Taxable Income = $92,550 – $22,300 – $13,600 = $56,650.

The tax on the Taxable Income is found in a Tax Table if the Taxable Income is less than $100,000 and is computed if over $100,000. Both are used. The Tax Tables are in the 2007 1040 Instructions. The Tax Tables list income in $50 increments for all categories of taxpayers, single, married filing jointly, married filing separately, and head of household. For the Taxable Income range of "at least $56,650 but less than $56,700" the tax is $7,718 for a taxpayer who is married filing jointly.

The 2007 tax rates schedule for married filing jointly is:

The tax is 10% on the first $15,650                     =  $1,565.00

plus 15% of the amount over $15,650 ($56,650 – $15,650) =  $41,000 x 15%  =  $6,150.00

Total ($1,565.00 + $6,150.00)                           =  $7,715.00

In addition to the Federal income tax, John probably pays state income tax, Social Security tax, and Medicare tax. The Social Security tax in 2007 for John is 6.2% on the first $97,500 of earned income (wages), or a maximum of $6,045. There are no exclusions from earned income for Social Security so John pays the maximum of $6,045. His wife pays $12,000 x 6.2% = $744. Medicare is 1.45% on all earned income with no maximum. John and his wife pays $112,000 x 1.45% = $1,624 for Medicare in 2007.

Most states also levy income tax, exceptions being Alaska, Florida, Nevada, South Dakota, Texas, Washington, New Hampshire, Tennessee and Wyoming.

See also
 Income tax threshold

References

External links
 More about Canada Personal Income Tax Rates, Brackets and Surtaxes for 2011

Tax incidence